Chandgad is a Small city and tehsil headquarters of chandgad taluka, of Kolhapur district that is in the Indian state of Maharashtra.

This is a small city having a population of about 12,000. This place is 110  km from Kolhapur but only 36  km from Belgaum City. Chandgad is located on the Belgaum-Vengurle state highway. Amboli hill station is the only 32  km from Chandgad. People of Chandgad town and taluka are reliant on Belgaum and Gadhinglaj cities for their major needs.

Villages in Chandgad 
Kalyanpur, Maharashtra
 Kanadi-Padatewadi, also known as Kanadi village, is a village on the bank of the Ghatprabha river.

History
There are a number of forts in Chandgad, out of them killa Pargad was importantly used by Marathas to resist the attack of the Portuguese from Goa; sardar of this fort were rayaba malusare, Gaikwad, Pednekar gharane, and Sawant. Kille Kalanandigad is protected by Gaikwad families of Halkarni and kille Pargad is protected by Pednekar. There are a substantial number of Chardo families in this area as they had migrated due to the persecution of the Portuguese in Goa. They amount to almost half the population.

Chandgad was formerly a part of Belagavi District, but during reorganization of Maharashtra state the entire taluka was merged into Kolhapur District.

Marathi and Konkani are the native languages. Konkani (Malwani Konkani) is spoken mostly in the western part. The Goan Catholic community speaks Goan Konkani.

Geography

Chandgad is the southernmost taluka for Kolhapur district. Chandgad receives more rainfall compared to any other town of Kolhapur district, receives nearly 3000 mm of rainfall under the direct influence of the Arabian Sea branch of the South-West monsoon. Rainy season period is from June to September. The rains subside in September, with the occasional rainfall in October and November. Being part of Western Ghat, Chandgad's surroundings are rich in biodiversity. Many new species of flora and fauna are found in this region. It is covered with dense lush green forest.

Rice, sugar cane, cashew nut, sweet potato, and potato are the major crops. A large number of cashew nut tree plantations are located in the area.

Ghataprabha and Tamraparni are the largest rivers of Chandgad. Many dams are in Chandgad. Jangam Hatti dam is one of the major source of water to many villages in Chandgad Taluka.

Climate
The rainy season witnesses heavy rains by the South-West Monsoon. The monsoon period is from June to September with rainfall averaging more than 3000 mm every year and heavy winds. Since the city is located on the Western Ghat, it has a pleasant climate, with temperatures in the range of 36°C to 29°C during summer and 21°C to 14°C during winter.

Places of interest

Here the climate is cool like Mahabaleshwar, so it is called "Prati Mahabaleshwar". Swapnvel point and Kille Pargad are among the tourist spots in Chandgad. Amboli hill station is very close to Chandgad.

Chandgad has multiple fort including Pargad
in west, Chandgad was earth fort (Bhooi Killa), Kalanandigadh in center, Mahipalgadh in east.

Tilari Dam, Swapnavel Point. Jangamhatti and Ghataprabha dam which is built near Kanur Khurd village on Ghataprabha river are the bigger dams of here. At Tilarinagar there is one popular electricity generation plant which provides power to the Goa. Daulat sugar factory is located at Halkarni.

Kowad, the birthplace of Padmashri Ranjit Desai, is a village in east part based on the bank of Tamrparni River.

Ravalnath temple is located here. Ravalnath is a popular Shaivite deity in west coastal region of India, figuring predominantly Adure (Sateari) Goa, the Sindhudurg district and some areas of Kolhapur district specially Chandgad and Ajra taluka of Maharashtra and some areas of Karnataka. Mateshwar temple is very close to Chandgad, and this temple's association with God Mateshwar is celebrated with a Mateshwara Festival. 
Mangaon on the bank of Tamraparni river .Mankeshwar temple and also the simdev temple are there in this village .

Agriculture
Chandgad mostly depends on agriculture. This place has many crops like paddy, nachani, banana, sugar cane, and cashews. There are large number of cashew nut processing factories in the Chandgad region. Chandgad has three sugar factories, one co-operative, Daulat Sugar Factory, Halkarni; and two private, Hemarus sugars, Rajgoli and ECO CANE SUGAR ENERGY LIMITED mahalunge khalsa. Daulat factory has now shut down its productions due to financial problems and corruption at the political level.

Transportation

Road
Chandgad is connected to its district headquarters city Kolhapur 112 km away through Chandgad-Kolhapur road via Gadhinglaj. Chandgad is connected to Belagavi and vengurla via State Highway 121. Belagavi is on National Highway-4 (connecting Maharashtra [Now part of the Golden Quadrilateral], Karnataka, Andhra Pradesh and Tamil Nadu) and 4A (connecting Karnataka and Goa). For public Transportation, MSRTC and KSRTC buses are available. Chandgad is well connected to Sawantwadi through State Highway 121, which connects to Mumbai-Goa National Highway-17.

Air
Dabolim Airport in Vasco da Gama, Goa  is the major international airport 118  km away.  Belgaum  Airport is another airport 40 km away.

Rail
Chandgad is well connected to Belagavi. Belagavi is on the main Indian Railways grid, being part of south western division and is well connected by rail to major destinations such as Bangalore, Mysore, Hubballi, Mangalore, Pune, Mumbai, Hyderabad, Goa, New Delhi and Chennai. Chandgad is well connected to Sawantwadi via State highway 121. Sawantwadi is connected to Konkan Railway. Through Konkan Railway, chandgad is connected to the major destinations such as Mumbai, Ratnagiri, Goa, Karwar, Udupi, Mangalore and Kerala.

References

Cities and towns in Kolhapur district
Talukas in Maharashtra